The albums discography of Wanda Jackson, an American recording artist, consists of 44 studio albums, 37 compilation albums, four live albums, one video album, two box sets and has appeared on 26 albums. In 1954 at age sixteen, Jackson signed with Decca Records as a country music artist. The label did not issue a record until the 1962 compilation Lovin' Country Style, six years after Jackson left Decca. She signed with Capitol Records in 1956, and her self-titled debut studio album was released three years later. Although Jackson had recently been identifying herself as a rock-and-roll performer, the album consisted of country music recordings. However, it did contain Jackson's future rock-and-roll hit "Let's Have a Party", which was a hit in 1960, reaching the Top 40 on the Billboard Pop chart. The success of her rock-and-roll recordings led to the release of two more rock-and-roll studio LPs: Rockin' with Wanda (1960) and There's a Party Goin' On (1961). Additionally, Capitol issued two "split" studio albums (Right or Wrong and Two Sides of Wanda) which contained rock and roll on one side and country music on the other.

As rock and roll started declining in the early 1960s, Jackson was remarketed as a country artist. During this transitional period, her album production moved towards country pop and Nashville Sound styles on studio LPs such as Wonderful Wanda (1962) and Love Me Forever (1963). Jackson's 1965 studio album Blues in My Heart was her first to chart on a Billboard Magazine album list, peaking at number nine on the Country LP chart. While recording a tribute album to the Country Music Hall of Fame in 1967, Jackson issued an album of German songs, entitled Made in Germany. While remaining on Capitol Records, various country-marketed studio albums were issued that peaked in the Billboard Top Country Albums chart: Reckless Love Affair (number 17), Cream of the Crop (number 25), The Many Moods of Wanda Jackson (number 28), and I've Gotta Sing (number 19). In 1968, the compilation album The Best of Wanda Jackson reached number 29 on the Top Country Albums chart. Her first live album, Wanda Jackson in Person, was released the following year.

Converting to Christianity in 1971, Jackson released her first religious studio album, Praise the Lord. Deciding to record more religious music, she signed with the Word and Myrrh labels in the mid-1970s. Several albums of gospel hymns were issued, such as Make Me Like a Child Again (1976), I'll Still Love You (1976), and Show Me the Way to Calvary (1981). Additionally, Jackson released several cover records of country recordings, including Good Times (1980), Let's Have a Party (1982), and Classy Country (1988). Around this time, Jackson's rock-and-roll material was revived in Europe, where she launched a tour and issued several rockabilly studio albums, including Rockabilly Fever (1984), recorded in Sweden; a duet album with Karel Zich in 1987; and a live album in 1989. In response, the German-based Bear Family Records issued two box sets of Jackson's rock and country recordings. Jackson continued issuing gospel as well as rock albums into the 1990s. SHe released a fourth live album in 2000. Her album Heart Trouble (2003) and an album of cover versions of Elvis Presley songs both received critical acclaim. Following her induction into the Rock and Roll Hall of Fame (2009), Jack White (of the White Stripes) produced Jackson's "comeback album", The Party Ain't Over (2011), which brought renewed success to Jackson. The album became her first since 1973 to chart, peaking at number 58 on the Billboard 200 and number 17 on the Top Rock Albums chart. With The Party Ain't Over, Jackson became the oldest female artist to place an album on the Billboard 200 chart, at the age of 73. In October 2012, Justin Townes Earle produced her forty-fifth studio record, Unfinished Business, which reached number 61 on the Top Country Albums chart.

Studio albums

1950s–1960s

1970s

1980s

1990s–2000s

2010s–2020s

Compilation albums

1960s–1980s

1990s–2010s

Live albums

Video albums

Box sets

Other appearances

Notes

References

External links 
 Official Website

Christian music discographies
Country music discographies
Discographies of American artists
Rock music discographies